This is a list of notable List of Media Companies of Bangladesh.

B

 Beximco

D

 Destiny Group

F

 Fatman Films

G

 Globe Janakantha Shilpa Paribar

J

 Jaaz Multimedia

M

 Monsoon Films

P

 Ping Pong Entertainment

R

 RealVU

T

 Tiger Media Limited

List
Media
Lists of mass media in Bangladesh